Gayatri Vihar is a small colony in the heart of Dehradun, Uttarakhand, India. The construction of houses began in this area around 1998. It consists of two lanes, each comprising around 20 houses.
It lies within the Vijay Park extension and is just 500 metres from Balliwala Chowk of Dehradun. Being a small locality, it consists of around 40 families.

Geography of Dehradun
Neighbourhoods in Uttarakhand